"Antmusic" is a song by English rock band Adam and the Ants, released as the third single in the UK from the album Kings of the Wild Frontier.

"Antmusic" (often stylised as 'Antmusic') peaked at No. 2 in the UK in January 1981, being held off the top by the re-release of John Lennon's "Imagine" after his murder in New York City on 8 December 1980. In Australia, the single spent five weeks at No. 1 on the Kent Music Report and earned the band platinum certification for sales of over 100,000 copies. It also reached No. 2 in South Africa, No. 4 in Ireland, and No. 6 in New Zealand. In the North America, the song reached No. 14 on the US Rock Albums & Top Tracks chart, as well as number 19 on the National Disco Action Top 30 chart (alongside "Dog Eat Dog" and "Kings of the Wild Frontier"), but it did not find success in Canada.

The music video to "Antmusic" features the group playing in a discothèque with a giant juke box, and persuading the young audience to turn away from disco music and dance to the new-styled "Antmusic". The music video was directed by Steve Barron.

The song was featured in the 2015 film Ant-Man.

"Fall In"
It was common for Ant to record new versions of his pre-1980 compositions for the B-side of his singles. For this single, a song dating back to the pre-Ants band the B-Sides in 1976 called "Fall In" was used. The song was co-written by Ant and Lester Square and originally titled "Fall Out" until the Police released a song by that same name in May 1977. A recording has surfaced of the song being performed by the Ants at a private preview show in a Muswell Hill bedroom on 5 May 1977.  Following Square's departure, Ant added new lyrics referencing the band's regular rehearsal space at the Screen on the Green cinema in Islington. The resulting version was first recorded as a home demo in Putney in July 1977, and a full band demo was recorded at Decca Studios in August 1978. The version on the Antmusic B-side was recorded in 1980 during sessions for the Kings album at Rockfield Studios. The song has been a frequent feature of Ant's live setlists both with the Ants and solo from 1977 to the present day. Live versions have been released on the 1994 live album Antmusic: The Very Best of Adam Ant: Disc Two and in excerpt form on the 2014 documentary The Blueblack Hussar directed by Jack Bond. The 1978 Decca Studios version appears in full as closing credit music on the 2015 DVD live video album Dirk Live at the Apollo.

Square's later band the Monochrome Set also continued to perform a version of the song, with new lyrics, under the title "Fallout". The song appeared as a B-side to the 1979 single "He's Frank (Slight Return)" as well as a 1979 Peel Session. Another joint Ant/Square composition titled "Fat Fun", which had similar shared ownership between the two bands (albeit again with differing lyrics), was recorded by the Ants at Rockfield Studios but not released until 2000 on the Antbox box set. The Monochrome Set's version of "Fat Fun" can be heard on the compilation Volume, Contrast, Brilliance....

Charts and certifications

Weekly charts

Year-end charts

Certifications

Cover versions
Robbie Williams recorded a cover version on the B-side of his single "No Regrets" in 1998, which was used in A Bug's Life.
OK Go released a cover version of it on the B-side of the single "Get Over It".
DJ Hyper recorded a cover featuring Leeroy Thornhill for their album We Control.
The Charlatans and Dirty Pretty Things covered it live on Transmission on 5 September 2008
Rogue Traders recorded a song titled "Would You Raise Your Hands?" which contained samples from "Antmusic", including the lyrics "So unplug the jukebox and do us all a favour".
The Quakes recorded a cover version on the album Psyops in 2005.
Hypnolovewheel recorded a cover of the song that was included on the compilation album Freedom of Choice: Yesterday's New Wave Hits as Performed by Today's Stars.

References

External links

1980 songs
1980 singles
1981 singles
Adam and the Ants songs
Music videos directed by Steve Barron
Number-one singles in Australia
Songs written by Marco Pirroni
Songs written by Adam Ant
Epic Records singles
CBS Records singles
Song recordings produced by Chris Hughes (record producer)